The 1985 NCAA Women's Division I Swimming and Diving Championships were contested at the fourth annual NCAA-sanctioned swim meet to determine the team and individual national champions of Division I women's collegiate swimming and diving in the United States. 

This year's events were hosted at the Alabama Aquatics Center at the University of Alabama in Tuscaloosa, Alabama

Defending champions Texas again topped the team standings, finishing 243 points ahead of Florida, claiming the Longhorns' second women's team title.

Team standings
Note: Top 10 only
(H) = Hosts
(DC) = Defending champions
Full results

See also
List of college swimming and diving teams

References

NCAA Division I Swimming And Diving Championships
NCAA Division I Swimming And Diving Championships
NCAA Division I Women's Swimming and Diving Championships